Maudlin means "excessively sentimental". It may also refer to:

 Maudlin, Cornwall
 Maudlin, West Sussex
 Maudlin Castle, Kilkenny, Ireland
 Maudlin's Cemetery, Naas, Ireland
 Tim Maudlin, (born 1968) philosopher of science
 Magdalene College, Cambridge, pronounced /ˈmɔːdlɨn/ MAWD-lin
 Magdalen College, Oxford, pronounced /ˈmɔːdlɨn/ MAWD-lin

See also
Maudling (disambiguation)